is the name of two adjacent railway stations located in the city of Kitaakita, Akita Prefecture, Japan. One is operated by  JR East and the other is operated by the third sector railway operator Akita Nairiku Jūkan Railway.

Lines
Takanosu Station is served by the Ōu Main Line, and is located 379.5 kilometers from the terminus of the line at Fukushima Station.

Station layout
Takanosu Station consists of one side platform and one island platform serving three tracks for use by the JR East portion of the station. However, Platform 3 is not in normal use. The adjacent Akita Nairiku Railway portion of the station uses a single bay platform

JR East platforms

Akita Nairiku platform

History
Takanosu Station opened on August 7, 1900 as a station on the Japanese Government Railways (JGR) serving the town of Takanosu, Akita. The JGR Aniai Line began operations from December 10, 1934. The JGR became the Japanese National Railways (JNR) after World War II. The station was absorbed into the JR East network upon the privatization of the JNR on April 1, 1987.

Passenger statistics
In fiscal 2018, the JR portion of the station was used by an average of 581 passengers daily (boarding passengers only).

Surrounding area
Kitaakita City Hall
Kitaakita Culture Center
Kitaakita City Library

See also
 List of railway stations in Japan

References

External links

 JR East Station information 
  Nairiku Railway Station information  

Railway stations in Japan opened in 1900
Railway stations in Akita Prefecture
Ōu Main Line
Kitaakita